Patiyali  Assembly constituency is  one of the 403 constituencies of the Uttar Pradesh Legislative Assembly,  India. It is a part of the Kasganj district. Patiyali Assembly constituency comes under Etah Lok Sabha constituency. First election in this assembly constituency was held in 1969 after the delimitation order was passed in 1967. After the "Delimitation of Parliamentary and Assembly Constituencies Order" was passed in 2008, the constituency was assigned identification number 102.

Wards  / Areas
Extent  of Patiyali Assembly constituency is KCs Ganjdundwara, Patiyali, Dariyavganj,  PCs Samothee, Bhujpura, Sidhapura, Kaliyanee, Sarabal, Ajeet Nagar, Sailot,  Hamirpur, Utarana, Jasmai, Viloutee of Sidhapura KC, Sidhpura NP, Patiyali  NP, Bhargain NP & Ganjdundwara MB of Patiyali Tehsil.

Members of the Legislative Assembly

Election results

2022

2017
Mamtesh Shakya of BJP, Dheerendra Bahadur Singh of BSP and Kiran Yadav of SP were the major contestants among the 11 contestants of 2017 Assembly Election.

2012
Najeeva Khan Zeenat of Samajwadi Party won the seat by defeating Suraj Singh Shakya from Bahujan Samaj Party with a margin of 27,775 votes.

See also
Etah district
Etah Lok Sabha constituency
Sixteenth Legislative Assembly of Uttar Pradesh
Uttar Pradesh Legislative Assembly
Vidhan Bhawan

References

External links
 

Assembly constituencies of Uttar Pradesh
Kasganj district
Constituencies established in 1967